Anonaepestis tamsi is a species of snout moth in the genus Anonaepestis. It was described by John David Bradley in 1965 and is known from Cameroon and the Central African Republic.

The larvae feed on Piper nigrum. They bore the stem of their host plant.

References

Moths described in 1965
Phycitini
Moths of Africa